Gellertiella hungarica is a species of Gram-negative bacteria.

References

Rhizobiaceae